For many years before the Open Era of tennis in 1968, the usual format for the handful of touring tennis professionals was a series of two-man one-night stands across the United States and often in other countries as well. The most notable of these tours were the "World Series" or "World Professional Championships", in which the reigning world champion went head-to-head against a challenger, most often the leading amateur of the previous year who had just turned pro. Promoters would attempt to sign the leading amateur to a contract with a minimum guarantee against a percentage of gate receipts, making a similar type of deal with the reigning professional champion and sometimes giving smaller percentages to undercard players. The winners of the tours were described as being the "world champion".

After World War II, with an increasing number of prominent professional players, there were occasionally tournament series with point systems which created official rankings for the complete field of pros. The tournament ranking series were held in 1946, 1959 and 1960 and there were also World Championship tours in these same three years involving only a few pros. The last World Championship two-man tour was held in 1963, featuring a final set of matches of Ken Rosewall against Rod Laver. From 1964 until 1967, a tournament series with a point system determined the pro No. 1 player. Some shorter two-man or four-man tours continued to be held from 1964 onward, as there had been since the late 1920's, but without a world title at stake.

World Championship tours

Winners

Tournament ranking series
There were occasionally important professional tournament series which were referred to as establishing full field rankings, necessitated by the increasing number of prominent professional players in the post-WWII period.  In 1946, there was a professional tournament series of 18 events in the U.S. under the organization of the P.P.A.T. (Professional Players Association of Tennis) linked by a points system won by Bobby Riggs, which he relied upon as evidence of his mastery of the entire pro field. In 1959, Jack Kramer established a series of 15 tournaments in Australia, North America, and Europe linked by a points system which provided a full field ranking of all the contract professionals, plus a substantial money prize for the top finisher, with Lew Hoad emerging as world No. 1. The 1959 tournament series was officially named the "Ampol Open Trophy", after the principal sponsor of the tournaments, the Ampol oil company, and the trophy awarded to the winner. The 1959 tournament series was referred to as "the world series" in Kramer's brochure and a newspaper report. In 1960, Kramer again established a tournament series with a points system, but both Gonzales and Hoad withdrew from the field and the final results are unknown. In 1964, under Kramer's advice, the I.P.T.P.A. (International Professional Tennis Players Association) established a series of 17 tournaments in U.S. and Europe with a points system, and a world No. 1 and world champion was named as a result, Ken Rosewall.  This system continued in subsequent years, with Rod Laver attaining the No. 1 ranking position for the 1965, 1966, and 1967 pro tournament series. The final results of these later tournament series were not published. In 1968–69, the two pro tennis tours, the NTL and the WCT, each had a tournament series ranking list which contributed four players from each tour to a combined final tournament at the Madison Square Garden. Tony Roche won the 1968 event, and Rod Laver won the 1969 event. Beginning in 1970, the ILTF authorized Kramer to arrange a year-end championship in which the pros with the highest tournament series points competed for the title of Grand Prix champion. This event was held in various locations and finally remained at Madison Square Garden from 1977 to 1989. In 1990, the ATP took over running the event and started awarding ranking points for the 8 qualifiers based on their results in the tournament. Currently, the championship is known as the "ATP Finals".

Winners

Other professional tours

Women

Men

See also
 Major professional tennis tournaments before the Open Era
 World number 1 ranked male tennis players
 Top ten ranked male tennis players (1912–1972)

Notes

Tournament series:

References

Bibliography

External links
 History of the Pro Tennis Wars, by Ray Bowers:
 Chapter I: Suzanne Lenglen and the First Pro Tour
 Chapter II, Part 1: The eminence of Karel Kozeluh and Vincent Richards 1927–1928
 Chapter II, Part 2: Deja vu 1929–1930
 Chapter III: Tilden's Year of Triumph in 1931
 Chapter IV: Tilden and Nusslein, 1932–1933
 Chapter V: The Early Ascendancy of Vines, 1934
 Chapter VI: Vines's Second Year: 1935
 Chapter VII: Awaiting Perry, 1936
 Chapter VIII: Perry and Vines, 1937
 Chapter IX: Readying for Budge, 1938
 Chapter X: Budge's Great Pro Year, 1939
 Chapter XI: America, 1940–1941
 Chapter XII: America, 1942
 Chapter XIII: The high war years, 1943–1945

History of tennis
Pro Tours
Professional tennis before the Open Era
Pro Tours